Lockhartia longifolia is a species of orchid native to western South America and Venezuela.

References

longifolia